The Liga Mexicana de Fútbol Femenil is the top level women's football league in the Mexican football league system. The league was made as an attempt to help women's football grow in Mexico. This first nationwide league was established in 2007. Record champions are Morelia and Rio Soccer with four titles. Today the Liga features three divisions, the top one has always been called the Superliga.

The Superliga failed to attract big sponsors, fans and media attention basically from the start. In 2017 the Liga MX Femenil was created, another and more promising try to establish a professional league. Both leagues are not connected by the league system, but the super league has lost its top division status.

One step below the Superliga is the Premier Liga and below that the Segunda Division.

Competition format
The league is played in the Apertura and Clausura format, meaning two seasons are played each year. In the year's first half the Clausura and in the later half the Apertura. The league is divided into two groups, in 2016 for example there were 15 teams in each group. After the regular season, playoffs will be played between the best placed teams in each group. Four or eight teams advanced from each group in the past years. As of the 2016 Apertura eight teams advance from each group.

The play-offs, including the final are played in two-legs. Also in the final there is no away goals rule applied and games tied on goals will go into extra-time.

History
On 28 September 2007, the Super Liga Femenil started with two games: América versus Guadalajara and Universidad de Guadalajara versus UNAM.

Teams

SuperLiga Zona Centro

SuperLiga Zona Bajío

Premier clubs (2nd level)

Segunda División clubs (3rd level)

Champions
The list of all finals:

Titles by team
After 2017 Clausura.

See also
 Women's association football around the world

References

External links
limeffe.com, official website
Federación Mexicana de Fútbol Asociación (Spanish)

Women
Mexico
Football
Sports leagues established in 2007
Professional sports leagues in Mexico